Bartholomäus Keckermann (c. 1572 – 25 August (or July) 1609) was a German writer, Calvinist theologian and philosopher. He is known for his Analytic Method. As a writer on rhetoric, he is compared to Gerhard Johann Vossius, and considered influential in Northern Europe and England.

Biography
Keckermann was born in Gdańsk (Danzig), in the Kingdom of Poland, to Calvinists Georg and Gertrude Keckermann and attended the local Academic Gymnasium before moving on to the University of Wittenberg (May 1590) and the University of Leipzig (spring 1592). However following the death of Prince Christian I in 1591, Keckermann participated in the migration of Calvinist academics to the University of Heidelberg in October 1592. He received his Master of Arts degree on 27 February 1595. On 4 February he was appointed Professor of Hebrew there. In 1601 he returned to his home town to teach as rector (1602–1608) at the Gymnasium of Danzig. His numerous works were published towards the end of his short life, or (most of them) posthumously.

Keckermann died in Danzig. He is described in Melchior Adam's works.

Publications
Publications: 
Praecognitorum logicorum tractatus tres (Hanau, 1599).
Systema grammaticae Hebraeae, sive, sanctae linguae exactior methodus (Hanau, ca. 1600?).
Systema logicae, tribus libris adornatum, pleniore praeceptorum methodo, et commentariis scriptis ad praeceptorum illustrationem (Hanau, 1600).
Systema logicae, compendiosa methodo (Hanau, 1601).
Systema S. S. Theologiae, tribus libris adornatum. Methodum ac dispositione[m] operis tabula praefixa adumbrat. Cum indice rerum & verborum locupletissimo (Hanau, 1602).
Systema logicae minus. Succincto praeceptorum compendio tribus libris adornatum ... ut servire possit gymnasio Dantiscano ... (Gdansk, 1605).
Gymnasium logicum (London, 1606).
Systema disciplinae politicae, publicis praelectionibus anno MDCVI propositum in gymnasio Dantiscano (Hanau, 1607).
Systema ethicae, tribus libris adornatum [et] publicis praelectionibus traditum in gymnasio Dantiscano (Hanau and London, 1607). 
Systema rhetoricae, in quo artis praecepta plene et methodice traduntur (Hanau, 1608).
Apparatus practicus sive idea methodica et plena totius philosophiae practicae (Hanau, 1609).
Scientiae metaphysicae compendiosum systema (Hanau, 1609).
Systematis logici plenioris (Hanau, 1609).
Systema physicum, septem libris adornatum (Hanau, 1610).
Systema astronomiae compendiosum (Hanau, 1611).
Systema geographicum duobus libris adornatum (Hanau, 1612).
Systema systematum clarissimi viri Dr. Bartholomaei Keckermanni, omnia hujus autoris scripta philosophica uno volumine comprehensa lectori exhibens, 2 vols. (Hanau, 1613).

References

Concise Routledge Encyclopedia of Philosophy. Routledge; 2000. 
Joseph S. Freedman The Career and Writings of Bartholomäus Keckermann (d.1609) Proceedings of the American Philosophical Society 141 (3): 305-364 (1997); reprinted in: J. S. Freedman Philosophy and the Arts in Central Europe, 1500-1700. Aldershot, Ashgate, 1999.
Ralf Kern. Wissenschaftliche Instrumente in ihrer Zeit. Vol. 1: Vom Astrolab zum mathematischen Besteck''. Cologne, 2010. p. 338.

External links

Biografie

Online Galleries, History of Science Collections, University of Oklahoma Libraries High resolution images of works by and/or portraits of Bartholomaus Keckermann in .jpg and .tiff format.

1570s births
1609 deaths
People from Royal Prussia
Writers from Gdańsk
Academic staff of the Collegium Sapientiae (Heidelberg)
17th-century Calvinist and Reformed theologians
German Calvinist and Reformed theologians
17th-century German Protestant theologians
German male non-fiction writers
16th-century German writers
16th-century German male writers
17th-century German writers
17th-century German male writers